X Faktorius is the Lithuanian version of The X Factor, a series originating from the United Kingdom. Based on the original UK show, the concept of the series is to find new singing talent (solo or groups) contested by aspiring singers drawn from public auditions. The series first aired on 14 October 2012.

Series summary
To date, ten series have been broadcast, as summarised below.

 Contestant in "Saulius Prūsaitis"
 Contestant in "Saulius Urbonavičius"
 Contestant in "Rūta Ščiogolevaitė"
 Contestant in "Vytautas Šapranauskas"
 Contestant in "Marijonas Mikutavičius"
 Contestant in "Justina Arlauskaité-Jazzu"
 Contestant in "Andrius Mamotovas"

Judges' categories and their contestants
In each series, each judge is allocated a category to mentor and chooses three acts to progress to the live finals. This table shows, for each series, which category each judge was allocated and which acts he or she put through to the live finals.

Key:
 – Winning judge/category. Winners are in bold, eliminated contestants in small font.

Season 1

Contestants
Key:

 – Winner
 – Runner-up
 – Third Place

Live shows
The live shows started on 16 December 2012. Each week, the contestants perform and the voting lines open after the performances. When the results are announced, the bottom two contestants perform another song of their choice (the final showdown) and then judges choose which of the two to eliminate. If the judges' votes are tied, the vote goes to deadlock and the contestant with the fewest public votes that night is eliminated.

Each week while the voting is still in progress, there is a group performance by the remaining contestants or a musical performance from a guest (or a judge). Judge Saulius Prūsaitis performed on the first show with his group Happyendless, while the second one featured two group performances: one by the boys category and another without the boys. In week 3, Rūta Ščiogolevaitė sang "Run To You" and then "Proud Mary" duet with Kristina Radžiukynaitė, who was eliminated the previous week. KeyMono performed several songs the following week, while there was a group performance before the individual performances in week 5. Then the remaining contestants performed another one with presenter Marijonas Mikutavičius during the voting and Povilas Meškėla appeared on the sixth show with his group Rojaus Tūzai. Vaidas Baumila, a former contestant on the 2005 Lithuanian music competition "Dangus" performed the following week. He sang "'Til I Hear You Sing" from the Love Never Dies musical and then his own song called "Ieškok Manęs".

Results summary
Colour key

 Viktorija Vyšniauskaitė, a member of RSP, had vocal cord surgery and was absent from the group in weeks four and five. She appeared only in the second performance in week six.
 Valinčiūtė left the competition in week six because she was too ill to perform.
 After the elimination of Aleksandra Metalnikova, only her vote count was displayed and votes for the remaining two finalists were counted onwards.
 The voting percentages in week 10 for the second round do not add up to 100%, owing to the freezing of votes. Aleksandra Metalnikova received 17.68% of the final vote.

Season 2

Contestants
Key:

 – Winner
 – Runner-up
 – Third Place

Results summary
Colour key

Season 3

Contestants
Key:

 – Winner
 – Runner-up
 – Third Place

Results summary
Colour key

Season 4

Contestants
Key:

 – Winner
 – Runner-up
 – Third Place

Results summary
Colour key

Season 5

Contestants
Key:

 – Winner
 – Runner-up
 – Third Place

Results summary
Colour key

Season 6

Contestants
Key:
 – Winner
 – Runner-up
 – Third Place

Results summary
Colour key

Season 7

Contestants
Key:
 – Winner
 – Runner-up
 – Third Place

Results summary
Colour key

Season 8
For this series, the show was changed into a celebrity version titled X Faktorius Žvaigždės.

Contestants
Key:
 – Winner
 – Runner-up
 – Third Place
 – Withdrew

Results summary
Colour key

 Jokūbas Bareikis withdrew from the competition after revealing that he was self-isolating after being in contact with someone with COVID-19.

Season 9

Contestants
Key:
 – Winner
 – Runner-up
 – Third Place

Results summary
Colour key

Season 10

Contestants
Key:
 – Winner
 – Runner-up
 – Third Place

Results summary
Colour key

References

Lithuania
Lithuanian television series
Television series by Fremantle (company)
2012 Lithuanian television series debuts
2010s Lithuanian television series
Non-British television series based on British television series
TV3 (Lithuania) original programming